Carol Locatell (born December 13, 1940) is an American actress. She is known for her role in the 1985 slasher film, Friday the 13th: A New Beginning as the foul-mouthed mean lady Ethel.

Career
Locatell's first movie role was in the 1973 film Coffy. She also appeared in the Burt Reynolds films Paternity, Best Friends and Sharky's Machine. She also has made guest appearances on many television shows, including Bonanza, M*A*S*H, ER, The Practice, 7th Heaven, Touched by an Angel, Without a Trace, and Grey's Anatomy. In 2014 she appeared in season four, episode six of Shonda Rhimes' political drama series, Scandal as former First Lady Bitsy Cooper.

Personal life
Locatell is married to musician/songwriter composer Gregory Prestopino. They divide time between residences in New York City and Thousand Oaks, California, their primary residence.

Filmography

Films

Television

References

External links
 

American film actresses
American stage actresses
American television actresses
Living people
Place of birth missing (living people)
1940 births
20th-century American actresses
21st-century American actresses